This is a list of American television-related events in 1948.

Events

Other television events in 1948
CBS begins television network programming.  
The number of homes in the United States with a television set reaches one million.

Television programs

Debuts

Changes of network affiliation

Ending this year

Networks and services

Network launches

Television stations

Station launches

Network affiliation changes

Births

Deaths

References

External links 
List of 1948 American television series at IMDb